Hero Cycles Limited, based in Ludhiana, Punjab, is an Indian company that manufactures bicycles and bicycle related products. Pankaj M Munjal is the chairman and managing director of Hero Cycles.

History 

Hero Cycles was established in 1956 in Ludhiana Punjab, manufacturing bicycle components. Today, Hero Cycles is one of the world's largest manufacturers of bicycles, producing 18390 cycles per day. Hero Cycles Ltd. is part of Hero Motors Company. In 2016 Hero cycles exported to over 70 countries world-wide. The company is ISO9001 & ISO14001 certified.

The company acts in part as a white label manufacturer to various brands, in addition to selling motorcycles under the Hero and UT (formerly Urbantrail) brands. Hero Cycles bought the Firefox bicycle brand in 2015.

In 2015, Hero Cycles Lt. bought a majority stake in Avocet Sports Ltd., a UK distributor of bicycles, e-bikes, bicycle parts, and accessories. Insync Bikes brand was launched by Avocet in November 2018. In 2019, Hero bought a majority stake in German e-bike manufacturer HNF-Nicolai. In 2016, Hero bought 60% of Sri Lankan bicycle manufacturer BSH Ventures.

In 1986, the Guinness World Records called Hero Cycles the largest bicycle manufacturer in the world. for being the single largest producer of bicycles.

Group structure
Hero Cycles is part of Hero Motors Company (HMC).

The HMC family is made up of organizations such as Hero Cycles Ltd., Avocet Sports (UK), BSH (Sri Lanka), Firefox Bikes (not to be confused with the browser by Mozilla), Spur, HGD, Hero Motors, Munjal Hospitality, Munjal Kiriu, ZF Hero and OMA.

Plants
Hero Cycles, Ludhiana, Punjab

Hero Cycles, Ghaziabad, Uttar Pradesh

Hero Cycles, Bihta, Bihar

BSH Ventures Pvt. Ltd., Sri Lanka

ZF HERO Chasis Systems, Pune, Maharashtra

ZF HERO Chasis Systems, Chennai, Tamil Nadu

Munjal Kiriu, Manesar, Haryana

Munjal Kiriu, Ahmedabad, Gujarat

See also
 Hero Motors company

References

External links
 Hero Group

Cycle manufacturers of India
Companies based in Punjab, India
Economy of Ludhiana
Vehicle manufacturing companies established in 1956
Indian companies established in 1956
Indian brands
Hero Group
1956 establishments in East Punjab